Shawntel Smith Wuerch (born September 16, 1971) is an American beauty pageant contestant, who was Miss America in 1996. She was born in Muldrow, Oklahoma. She attended Oklahoma City University.

Personal life
Smith is married to tech executive, Ryan Wuerch. Together, Smith and her husband have 4 sons; Braden, Barrett, Brennan, and Bryson; 2 of which are from Wuerch's previous marriage. Wuerch was previously a board member for the Miss America Organization and is the co-founder and current CEO of DOSH, an, "app that puts money back into the pockets of consumers and businesses alike using breakthrough technology to eliminate wasted spending." In May 2017, DOSH and the Miss America Organization announced a sponsorship agreement.

References

External links
Oklahoma City University report

1971 births
Living people
People from Muldrow, Oklahoma
Miss America 1996 delegates
Miss America winners
Northeastern State University alumni
Oklahoma City University alumni